Barbara Baert (born 1967,Turnhout) is a Belgian art historian, and professor of art history at KU Leuven. In 2016 Baert earned the prestigious Francquiprijs, which is yearly awarded by the Francqui-Stichting to a scientist in human, exact and biological-medical sciences.

Career
Barbara Baert teaches in the fields of iconology, art theory and analysis, and medieval art. She is the founder of the Iconology Research Group, an international and interdisciplinary platform for the study of the interpretation of images. Baert is a fellow at Illuminare – Centre for Medieval and Renaissance Art (KU Leuven).

In 1997, Baert obtained a doctoral degree with her research on the True Cross, later published in English under the title A Heritage of Holy Wood: The Legend of the True Cross in Text and Image. She directed several international research programmes, including Mary Magdalene and the Touching of Jesus, an intra- and interdisciplinary investigation of the interpretation of John 20:17 sponsored by the Fund for Scientific Research Flanders (2004-2008) and The Woman with the Hemorrhage (Matthew 9:20-22; Mark 5:24-34; Luke 8:42b-48), an iconological study of the interpretation of the Haemorrhoissa in medieval art (4th-15th century) funded by the KU Leuven (2008-2012), Ornamenta sacra. Iconology of liturgical objects (2017-2021) (Belspo-Brain-be, UC Louvain and KIK/IRPA) and Kairós, or the Right Moment. Nachleben and iconology (2017-2022) (KU Leuven). Since January 2014 she has been a life member of the Royal Flemish Academy of Belgium for Science and the Arts. She is also a member of the Academia Europaea. Between April and September 2015, she held a fellowship at the Internationale Kolleg für Kulturtechnikforschung und Medienphilosophie (IKKM). As coordinator of the Iconology Research Group, Baert is the editor-in-chief of three peer-reviewed series: Iconologies (ASP editions), Studies in Iconology (Peeters Publishers), and Art & Religion (Peeters Publishers).

Prizes and awards 
Baert was honoured twice by the Royal Flemish Academy of Belgium for Science and the Arts: in 1993 for her outstanding thesis in art history entitled Het Boec van den Houte and in 2006 for her outstanding scientific career before the age of forty. In 2016, she was honoured the Pioneer's Award of the KU Leuven and the Francqui Prize for her pioneering work in iconology and medieval visual culture. In 2017 she received the honour of Commander of the Order of Léopold. In 2019 Baert became a member in residence of the Institute for Advanced Study (IAS) at Princeton. In 2020 Barbara Baert was a fellow at the Berlin Center for Advances Studies Bildevidenz and in 2021 she was the holder of the James Loeb Lecture at the Zentralinstitut für Kunstgeschichte, München. There she gave a lecture 'How Kairos transformed into Occasio (Grisaille, School of Mantegna, 1495-1510)' about the Kairos/Occasio motif. With her paper on the same motif, she offers the first complete status quaestionis on the meanings attributed to the grisaille from the first hypothesis of Aby Warburg (1866-1929) to the present. In 2023 Barbara Baert will take on the prestigious role of Warburg-Professur at the Warburg Haus in Hamburg.

Publications
 B. Baert, A Heritage of Holy Wood: The Legend of the True Cross in Text and Image, Leiden: Brill, 2004.
 B. Baert, "The Gaze in the Garden. Noli me tangere and embodiment in the 15th century Netherlands and Rhineland", in Body and Embodiment. Nederlands kunsthistorisch Jaarboek, 2007, pp. 37–61.
 B. Baert, "Touching the Hem. The Thread between Garment and Blood in the Story of the Woman with the Hemorrhage (Mark 5:24b-34parr)", in Das Kleid der Bilder, eds. Marius Rimmele & David Ganz (Textile Studies, 4), Konstanz-Zürich, 2012, pp. 159–182.
 B. Baert, Interspaces between Word, Gaze and Touch. The Bible and the Visual Medium in the Middle Ages. Collected essays on Noli me tangere, the Woman with the Haemorrhage, the Head of John the Baptist (Annua Nuntia Lovaniensia, LXII), Leuven: Peeters, 2011.
 B. Baert, Caput Joannis in Disco. Essay on a Man’s Head (Visualising the Middle Ages VMA 8), Leiden: Brill, 2012.
 B. Baert, L. Kusters and E. Sidgwick, "An issue of blood. The healing of the woman with the Haemorrhage (Mark 5.24B-34, Luke 8.42B-48, Matthew 9.19-22) in early medieval visual culture", in Blood, Sweat and Tears - The Changing Concepts of Physiology from Antiquity into Early Modern Europe, ed. M. Horstmanshoff (Intersections. Interdisciplinary Studies in Early Modern Culture, 25), Leiden: Brill, 2012, pp. 307–338.
 B. Baert, "Adam, Seth and Jerusalem. The Legend of the Wood of the Cross in Medieval Literature and Iconography", in Adam, le premier home (Micrologus’ Library, 45), Firenze (Sislem), 2012, pp. 69–99.
 B. Baert, Ann-Sophie Lehmann & Jenke van der Akkerveken, New Perspectives in Iconology: Visual Studies and Anthropology (Iconologies) Brussels (AspEditions), 2012.
 B. Baert, "The Johannesschüssel as Andachtsbild. The Gaze, the Medium and the Senses", in Disembodied Heads in Medieval and Early Modern Culture, ed. Catrien Santing, B. Baert & Anita Traninger (Intersections. Interdisciplinary Studies in Early Modern Culture, 28), Leiden: Brill, 2013, pp. 117–160.
 B. Baert, Late Mediaeval Enclosed Gardens of the Low Countries: Contributions to Gender and Artistic Expression (Studies in Iconology 2), Leuven: Peeters, 2015.
 B. Baert, Pneuma and the Visual arts in the Middle Ages and early Modernity (Art&Religion 5), Leuven-Walpole (Peeters), 2016.
 B. Baert, "Pentecost and the Senses. A Hermeneutical Contribution to the Visual Medium and the Sensorium in Early Medieval Manuscript Tradition", in Preaching after Easter, eds. Johan Leemans & Rich Bishop, Leiden: Brill, 2016, pp. 346–370.
 B. Baert, Kairos or Occasion as Paradigm in the Visual Medium. Nachleben, Iconography, Hermeneutics Leuven: Peeters, 2016.
 B. Baert, In Response to Echo. Beyond Mimesis or Dissolution as Scopic Regime (with Special Attention to Camouflage) (Studies in Iconology, 6), Leuven-Walpole, 2016.
 B. Baert, Revisiting Salome’s Dance in Medieval and Early Modern Iconology (Studies in Iconology, 7), Leuven-Walpole, 2016.
 B. Baert, "Stains. Trace-Cloth-Symptom", in Textile. Journal of Cloth and Culture, 15, 3, 2017, pp. 270–291.  
 B. Baert, About Stains or the Image as Residue (Studies in Iconology, 10), Leuven-Walpole, 2017.
 B. Baert, "Marble and the Sea or Echo Emerging. (A Ricercar)", in Treasures of the sea. Art or Craft, ed. Avinoam Shalem, Espacio, (Tiempo y Forma, Serie VII, Historia del Arte, 5) 2017, pp. 35–54. 
 B. Baert, "He or she who glimpses, desires, is wounded. A dialogue in the interspace between Aby Warburg and Georges Didi-Huberman", in Angelaki. Journal of the Theoretical Humanities, 23, 4, 2018, pp. 47–79. 
 B. Baert, What about Enthusiasm? A Rehabilitation. Pentecost, Pygmalion, Pathosformel (Studies in Iconology, 13), Leuven-Walpole, 2018.
 B. Baert, "Fragments" (Studies in Iconology, 14), ed. S. Heremans, Leuven-Walpole, 2018.
 B. Baert, Interruptions & Transitions. Essays on the Senses in Medieval and early Modern Visual Culture (Art and Material Culture in Medieval and Renaissance Europe, 14), Leiden, 2018.
 B. Baert, About Sieves and Sieving. Motif, Symbol, Technique, Paradigm, Berlin, 2019.
 B. Baert, De uil in de grot. Gesprekken met beelden, kunstenaars en schrijvers, Antwerp, 2019.
 B. Baert, The Weeping Rock. Revisiting Niobe through Paragone, Pathosformel and Petrification (Studies in Iconology, 17), Leuven-Walpole, 2020.
 B. Baert, Signed PAN. Erwin Panofsky’s (1892-1968) "The History of Art as a Humanistic Discipline"(Princeton, 1938) (Studies in Iconology, 18), Leuven-Walpole-Paris-Bristol, 2020.
 B. Baert, "Noli me tangere in the Codex Egberti (Reichenau, c. 977-93) and in the Gospel-Book of Otto III (Reichenau, 998-1000): Visual Exegesis in Context," in Illuminating the Middle Ages: Tributes to Prof. John Lowden, eds. Laura Cleaver, Alixe Bovey, Leiden, 2020, pp. 36–5.
 B. Baert, "Afterlife Studies and the Occasio Grisaille in Mantua (School of Mantegna, 1495-1510)," in Ikon, 13, 2020, pp. 95–108.
 B. Baert, "Life is Short, Art is Long, Crisis is Fleeting, Kairos or Weaving the Right Moment," in Textile. Journal of Cloth and Culture, 2020, pp. 1–23
 The Right Moment. Essays offered to Barbara Baert, Laureate of the 2016 Francqui Prize in Human Sciences, on the Occasion of the Celebratory Symposium at the Francqui Foundation, Brussels, 18-19 October 2018, in consultation with Han Lamers. Editorial assistance: Stephanie Heremans & Laura Tack, (Studies in Iconology, 20), Leuven - Paris - Bristol, CT: Peeters, 2021.
 From Kairos to Occasio Through Fortuna. Text/ Image/ Afterlife. On the Antique Critical Moment, a Grisaille in Mantua (School of Mantegna, 1495-1510) and the Fortunes of Aby Warburg (1866-1929), Brepols & Harvey Miller, 2021.
 The Gaze from Above. Reflections on Cosmic Eyes in Visual Culture. (Art & Religion, 11). Leuven: Peeters Publishers, 2021.
 Petrifying Gazes. Danaë and the Uncanny Space. (Studies in Iconology, 19). Leuven: Peeters Publishers, 2021.
 Baert, B., Hertog, T. & Van der Stock, J. Big Bang. Imagining the Universe. Veurne: Hannibal, 2021.
 "The Critical Moment. Revisiting the Annunciation in the Quattrocento: Wind, Kairos, Snail." In: J. Clifton, B. Haeger, E. Wise (Eds.), Marian Images in Context: Doctrines, Devotions, and Cults. (Brill's Studies on Art, Art History and Intellectual History). Leiden: Brill, 2022.
 Looking Into The Rain. Magic - Moisture - Medium. Berlin: De Gruyter, 2022.
 Baert, B., Claes, M-C. & Dekoninck, R. (Eds.) Ornamenta Sacra. Late Medieval and Early Modern Liturgical Objects in a European Context. (Art & Religion, 13). Leuven: Peeters, 2022.

References

External links 

List of all publications
Academia Europaea page
https://www.kuleuven.be/wieiswie/nl/person/00004564
ORCID
Curriculum Vitae

1967 births
People from Turnhout
KU Leuven alumni
Academic staff of KU Leuven
Belgian art historians
Living people
Members of Academia Europaea